Wachirathan Falls ( lit. Diamond Creek Falls, also spelled Vachirathan) are waterfalls in the Chom Thong district in the province of Chiang Mai, Thailand.

Geography
Wachirathan (lit. Diamond Creek) flows down a granite escarpment on the way up to the summit of Doi Inthanon, the highest mountain in Thailand. Although segmented, its falls have a cumulative height of 80 m. It is one of several waterfalls in the area.

References 

Waterfalls of Thailand
Geography of Chiang Mai province